Thomas Strobl (born 17 March 1960) is a German politician of the Christian Democratic Union (CDU) who has been serving as Deputy Minister-President of Baden-Württemberg since 2016.

From 1998 until 2016 Strobl was a member of the German Bundestag. In 2011 he was elected chairman of the CDU Baden-Württemberg, succeeding Stefan Mappus. In 2012 he was elected one of five vice federal chairmen of the CDU party in Germany.

Early life and education 
Strobl grew up in Heilbronn. His father was an accountant with the salt mines in Heilbronn, known as Südwestdeutsche Salzwerke AG, a state-owned enterprise (archives, local newspaper). After high school diploma he studied law at Heidelberg University. In 1985 he completed the first, and after postgraduate studies in Speyer in 1988 the second state examination in Heidelberg. He then was a research fellow at Heidelberg University and from 1992 to 1996 a Parliamentary Advisor at the Landtag of Baden-Württemberg. From 1996 he has worked as a lawyer. In 2001, he co-founded a law firm with Alexander Throm.

Member of the Bundestag, 1998–2016
Strobl first became of a Member of the German Bundestag in the 1998 national elections. From 1998 to 2009, he served on the Committee for the Scrutiny of Elections, Immunity and the Rules of Procedure, which he chaired from 2005. Between 2009 and 2013, he was also a member of the parliament's Council of Elders, which – among other duties – determines daily legislative agenda items and assigning committee chairpersons based on party representation. From 2009, he also led the Bundestag group of CDU parliamentarians from Baden-Württemberg, one of the largest delegations within the CDU/CSU parliamentary group.

At state level, Strobl served as Secretary General of the CDU Baden-Württemberg from 2005 to 2011, under party chairmen Günther Oettinger (2005-2009) and Stefan Mappus (2009-2011). In this capacity, he participated in the coalition talks with both the liberal Free Democratic Party and the Green Party following the 2006 state elections and managed the CDU election campaign in 2011.

Since 2011, Strobl has been chairman of the CDU in the state of Baden-Württemberg. In addition, he was elected vice chairman of the CDU in 2012 and has since been serving in the party's national leadership under successive chairwomen Angela Merkel (2012-2018) and Annegret Kramp-Karrenbauer (since 2018).

In the negotiations to form a Grand Coalition of the Christian Democrats (CDU together with the Bavarian CSU) and the Social Democrats (SPD) following the 2013 federal elections, Strobl was part of the CDU/CSU delegation in the working group on internal and legal affairs, led by Hans-Peter Friedrich and Thomas Oppermann. He was later appointed deputy chairperson of the CDU/CSU parliamentary group in charge of internal and legal affairs. In this capacity, he was part of the group's leadership around chairperson Volker Kauder. In addition to his committee assignments, Strobl was also a member of the German-Maltese Parliamentary Friendship Group.

In December 2015, Strobl presided over the CDU's 2015 national convention in Karlsruhe.

Baden-Württemberg's State Minister of the Interior, 2016–present
Ahead of the 2016 state elections, Strobl lost against Guido Wolf in a party-wide vote on who should run for the office of Minister-President of Baden-Württemberg.

After the elections, Strobl – alongside Guido Wolf – led the exploratory talks with the Alliance '90/The Greens party of Minister-President Winfried Kretschmann before starting formal coalition talks. Since May 2016, he has been serving as Deputy Minister-President and State Minister of the Interior, Digitisation and Migration in a coalition government of Greens and Christian Democrats in Baden-Württemberg (Cabinet Kretschmann II). As one of Baden-Württemberg's representatives at the Bundesrat, Strobl is a member of the Committee on Internal Affairs and of the German delegation to the NATO Parliamentary Assembly.

In the – unsuccessful – negotiations to form a coalition government with the Christian Social Union in Bavaria (CSU), the Free Democratic Party (FDP) and the Green Party following the 2017 national elections, Strobl was part of the 19-member delegation of the CDU.

Following his party's result in the 2019 European elections, Strobl announced his intention to not lead the CDU campaign to unseat incumbent Minister-President Kretschmann in Baden-Württemberg's 2021 state elections; instead, Susanne Eisenmann was nominated as Kretschmann's challenger in the 2021 Baden-Württemberg state election. In late 2019, he also announced his candidacy for a seat in the state parliament, but eventually trailed behind his rival of the Green Party.

Following the CDU's performance in the 2021 state elections, Strobl only received 66.5 percent of his party delegates’ votes in his re-election as chair.

Political positions
After the Green Party won Baden-Württemberg's state capital Stuttgart in 2012, Strobl publicly claimed that his party is "no longer in touch with the lifestyle of people in the cities."

In 2016, Strobl called for a tightening of German asylum rules, saying asylum-seekers should only be eligible for permanent residence in Germany after five years, rather than the current three.

Ahead of the Christian Democrats’ leadership election, Strobl publicly endorsed in 2020 Friedrich Merz to succeed Annegret Kramp-Karrenbauer as the party's chair; Merz eventually lost against Armin Laschet. For the 2021 national elections, Strobl later supported Laschet as the party's candidate to succeed Chancellor Angela Merkel.

2022 police scandal
The inspector of the Baden-Württemberg Police Andreas Renner is said to have explained his ideas about sexual practices to a female chief commissioner in a video chat in 2021 and offered her to support her career in exchange for sexual services. Disciplinary and investigation proceedings were then initiated against the man for sexual harassment and he was forbidden to conduct official business.

Renner's lawyer wrote a letter to his chef minister Thomas Strobl. Strobl passed the letter on to a journalist. As a result, the public prosecutor's office investigated the suspicion of instigating prohibited communications about court hearings (Section 353d No. 3, Section 26 of the Criminal Code (StGB)) against Strobl.

Other activities

Corporate boards
 L-Bank, Member of the Supervisory Board
 pro-PL GmbH, Member of the advisory board (2009-2011)
 Kreissparkasse Heilbronn, Member of the Board of Directors (1998-2016)

Non-profit organizations
 German Forum for Crime Prevention (DFK), Ex-Officio Member of the Board of Trustees
 Heilbronner Bürgerstiftung, Member of the Board of Trustees (since 2002)
 Memorial to the Murdered Jews of Europe, Member of the Board of Trustees (since 2010)
 ProStuttgart21, Member of the Board (2009-2013)
 German Association for Small and Medium-Sized Businesses (BVMW), Member of the Political Advisory Board (-2016)

Controversy
In May 2022, the Stuttgart public prosecutor's office initiated investigations against Strobl on suspicion of incitement to share prohibited communications about court hearings.

Recognition
 2015 – Order of Merit of the Federal Republic of Germany

Personal life
Since 1996, Strobl has been married to media manager Christine Schäuble, the oldest daughter of Wolfgang Schäuble.

References

External links 
  of Thomas Strobl
Thomas Strobl at the German Bundestag

1960 births
Living people
Members of the Bundestag for Baden-Württemberg
People from Heilbronn
Heidelberg University alumni
Recipients of the Cross of the Order of Merit of the Federal Republic of Germany
Members of the Bundestag 2013–2017
Members of the Bundestag 2009–2013
Members of the Bundestag 2005–2009
Members of the Bundestag 2002–2005
Members of the Bundestag 1998–2002
Members of the Bundestag for the Christian Democratic Union of Germany